François Thibaut (born January 3, 1948) is an American educator known for developing the Thibaut Technique second language acquisition method for children and is the Founder/Director of The Language Workshop for Children ("LWFC"). He currently operates nationwide educational centers based in New York City. Thibaut's technique is the basis of the curriculum offered at LWFC programs and in the Professor Toto children's language education animation. The LWFC begins teaching languages to children at the age of six months, when they're preverbal.

Childhood Observations, The Basis of the Thibaut Technique
At the age of six Thibaut was enrolled at the College Saint Barbe boarding school in Paris where teachers intentionally made little to no effort to translate or explain the meaning of the French language curriculum in which newly arriving, non-French speaking students found themselves immersed. Instead, after six weeks of absorbing French in a context-rich language immersion classroom, the non-French elementary age children would begin speaking French in single words. Then by week eight they were speaking in two, and then three word sentences.  Eventually, by 2½ months they were constructing complete, accent-free French sentences, correctly attributing noun genders, and using past, present, and future tenses.  Years later Thibaut realized that he'd observed a strong example of what neurolinguist Eric Lenneberg later identified in his book Biological Foundations of Language (1967) what he termed the critical period in language development. Thibaut's childhood observations eventually led him to bring immersive, emotionally stimulating, context-rich, language classes founding his Cercle Franco Americain (later Language Workshop for Children) classes in New York, NY in the early 1970s. Thus, the Thibaut Technique was introduced into American culture.

This approach has often been attributed to baby language enrichment products first introduced for VCR's in the mid-1990s. While many of these brands have had more national exposure, Thibaut's technique was in existence for more than 20 years prior to their debut.

Early Teaching Experience
Thibaut emigrated to New York City  in 1973, when foreign language instruction was strongly focused on high school and college students. As a teacher he was frustrated by watching his college-age students continually struggle the same drill and translation-based French so he began focusing on younger learners, abandoned translation-drills, and adopted the context-rich, language acquisition devices that he observed at his own elementary school in the 1950s, adding his own brand of playfulness, color, and humor.

The Language Workshop for Children
Since 1973, his internationally recognized Language Workshop for Children has offered stimulating language lessons for babies, toddlers and elementary grades. Original music, vocabulary-building songs, language immersion, festive visual aids, action games and native-fluent language teachers are why the LWFC is the country's leader in children's language educational play. As Thibaut says, "Children remember the words that make them happy".

The French Language Salon
In 2011, Thibaut drew on his successful technique with children by offering friendly, situationally relevant classes through his French Language Salon® classes for adults. Thibaut's new adult method immediately integrates grammar and conversation, rather than teaching them as separate disciplines. Thibaut's former child students often attend his adult classes to practice French for social and professional purposes. Thibaut also designed a test preparation program for students of varying levels who are working to pass in exams focused on French as a second language and comply with the Common European Framework of Reference for Languages.

Thibaut specializes in different types of test preparation that merge his original French teaching style with patterns that correlating to the pertaining exam (SAT, AP French, CEFRL, and Canadian TEF.)  He combines his French education experience with an understanding of the exams and their tendencies, inspired by the, "life-hack," movement and applied to a more academic and professional sphere.

Technology
With the growth of technology at the turn of the new century, Thibaut expanded his outreach platforms beyond the classroom by producing his Professor Toto Language Education Series for children, available in original CD/DVD and downloadable formats through Amazon, as well as making his language lessons and test prep services available via Skype.

Notes

Further reading
Shea, Sarah B. (2004–12). "The Best Baby Classes". Parents Magazine.
Langley, Monica. (1999-10-06). "Bringing Up (Bilingual) Baby". The Wall Street Journal.
Millard, Pauline M. (2001-06-24). "No-so-foreign words". Associated Press.
Hirsch, Joy. (1998-07-30). "Early learning is thriving in New York". BBC USA Direct News.
Holman, Jennifer R. (1998-01). "Learning a Language". Better Homes and Gardens.
McKeon, Nancy & Pollan, Corky. (1984-11-5). "Small Talk". New York Magazine.
Thibaut, Francois. (1999-05-31). "Small Talk". People Magazine.
Gangwer, Kristin. (2007-04-03). "Infant Industry: Mandarin for Babies? How to make your child multi-lingual". Babble.com.

External links
The Language Workshop for Children (www.LanguageWorkshopForChildren.com) children's educational program
French Language Salon (www.FrenchLanguageSalon.com) adult conversation courses
Professor Toto (www.ProfessorToto.com) language education series

American educators
Language education
Living people
1948 births